The 2014–15 Central Arkansas Bears basketball team represented the University of Central Arkansas during the 2014–15 NCAA Division I men's basketball season. The Bears were led by head coach Russ Pennell and played their home games at the Farris Center. They were members of the Southland Conference.

The Bears were picked to finish 12th in the Southland Conference Coaches' Poll and 11th in the Sports Information Director's Poll. They finished the season 2–27, 2–16 in conference, to finish in 13th and last place.  Due to APR penalties, they were not eligible for postseason play, including the Southland Tournament.

The team played the season with a roster made up of mostly freshmen, and point guard Jordan Howard was named the Southland Conference Freshman of the Year.

Off Season

On March 5, it was announced that UCA alumni Russ Pennell would be the team's new head coach for the following season.

In May, Central Arkansas was informed that the men's basketball team would not be eligible for postseason play for failure to achieve NCAA APR standards. The team also has reduced practice from six days per week down to five per week and will be allowed only 16 hours of practice time a week instead of the normal 20 hours per week. The Central Arkansas men's basketball program was one of nine programs that did not meet the APR standards.

Roster
Source:
Access Date: 9/19/2015

Schedule and Results
Source:

|-
!colspan=9 style="" | Exhibition

|-
!colspan=9 style="" | Non-Conference Regular Season

|-
!colspan=9 style="" | Conference Games

See also
2014–15 Central Arkansas Sugar Bears basketball team

References

Central Arkansas Bears basketball seasons
Central Arkansas
Central Arkansas Bears basketball team
Central Arkansas Bears basketball team